The Gray County War was a county seat war in Gray County, Kansas, between 1887 and 1893.

See also

 List of feuds in the United States
 Battle of Cimarron

References

County Seat Wars
Range wars and feuds of the American Old West
19th-century conflicts
1887 in Kansas
1893 in Kansas
History of Kansas